Lee Township may refer to one of the following places in the State of Illinois:

 Lee Township, Brown County, Illinois
 Lee Township, Fulton County, Illinois

See also

Lee Township (disambiguation)

Illinois township disambiguation pages